The Copa Presidente 1999–2000 is the first staging of the Copa El Salvador football tournament.

Knockout stage

Qualified teams
The nine group winners and the three best runners-up from the group stage qualify for the final stage.

Semi Final teams
The three group winners and the best runners-up from the quarterfinals group stage qualify for the semi final .

Final

References

External links
 http://archivo.elsalvador.com/noticias/EDICIONESANTERIORES/marzo11/DEPORTES/depor2.html

1999–2000 in Salvadoran football